Suuremõisa may refer to several places in Estonia:

Suuremõisa, Hiiu County, village in Pühalepa Parish, Hiiu County
Suuremõisa, Lääne County, village in Vormsi Parish, Lääne County
Suuremõisa, Saare County, village in Muhu Parish, Saare County